William George DuMoe (March 14, 1898 – May 6, 1983) was an American football tight end in the American Professional Football Association (the precursor to the National Football League) who played for the Green Bay Packers.  DuMoe played professionally for one season, in 1921.

References

External links

1898 births
1983 deaths
Players of American football from Duluth, Minnesota
American football tight ends
Green Bay Packers players